Siegfried Merced Regales (born 2 February 1953) is a sprinter who represented the Netherlands Antilles. He competed in the men's 100 metres at the 1976 Summer Olympics.

References

1953 births
Living people
Athletes (track and field) at the 1975 Pan American Games
Athletes (track and field) at the 1976 Summer Olympics
Dutch Antillean male sprinters
Olympic athletes of the Netherlands Antilles
Place of birth missing (living people)
Pan American Games competitors for the Netherlands Antilles